The 24-posture Simplified Form of t'ai chi ch'uan, sometimes called the Beijing or Peking form for its place of origin, is a short version of Taiji composed of twenty-four unique movements.

History
The form was the result of an effort by the Chinese Sports Committee, which, in 1956, brought together four Taiji teachers - Chu Guiting褚桂亭, Cai Longyun蔡龙云 , Fu Zhongwen傅鈡文, and Zhang Yu - to create a simplified form of Taiji as exercise for the masses. Some sources suggests that the form was structured in 1956 by master Li Tian Ji 李天骥 
. The creators truncated the traditional family style Taiji forms to 24 postures; taking about six minutes to perform and to give the beginner an introduction to the essential elements of Taijiquan, yet retain the traditional flavor of traditional longer hand forms (in general, 88-108 postures). Henceforth, this form was avidly promoted by the People's Republic of China for general exercise, and was also taught to internees in Communist "re-education" camps. Due to this official promotion, the 24-form is most likely the Taiji form with the most practitioners in China and the world over (though no surveys have been performed).

Movements

See also 
 Wushu (sport)
 42-form Taijiquan
 Taijijian

References

Further reading

External links
Simplified Tai Chi 24 form (YMAA Taijiquan) Yang style by Liang, Shou-Yu  displays names of each form as the movements are demonstrated.
Tai Chi 24 form moves in Chinese, Pinyin, English and 4 other languages  the movements' names in Chinese, Pinyin, English, German, French, Italian, and Spanish.

Chinese martial arts
Tai chi styles
Neijia